This is a listing of the horses that finished in either first, second, or third place and the number of starters in The Very One Stakes, an American stakes race for fillies and mares three years old and older at 5 furlongs on the turf held at Pimlico Race Course in Baltimore, Maryland.  (List 1973–present)

See also 
 List of graded stakes at Pimlico Race Course

References 

Lists of horse racing results
Pimlico Race Course